Badri Akhvlediani (born 30 January 1972) is a retired Georgian professional football player.

1972 births
Living people
Footballers from Georgia (country)
Georgia (country) international footballers
Association football defenders